This is a list of buildings that are examples of the Art Deco architectural style in Indiana, United States.

Evansville 
 325 Main Street (former J.H. Schultz Shoes), Evansville, 1909 and 1940s
 Bosse Field, Evansville, 1915
 Cambridge Arms Apartments, Evansville, 1920
 Children's Museum of Evansville, Evansville, 1931
 Evansville Civic Theatre (former Columbia Theatre), Evansville, 1910 and 1939
 Firestone Tire and Rubber Store, Evansville, 1930
 Greyhound Bus Terminal, Evansville, 1938
 Hulman Building, Evansville, 1928
 Indiana Bell Building, Evansville, 1929
 Lincoln School, Evansville, 1928
 Lynch School (now law offices), Evansville, 1930
 Old Fellwock Auto Company, Evansville, 1922
 Vectren Power Substation (former SIGECO substation), Evansville, 1935
 Zuki Restaurant (former a bank), Evansville, 1940

Fort Wayne 
 3414 Fairfield, Fort Wayne, 1940
 AT&T Building (former Indiana Bell Telephone Company Exchange Building), Fort Wayne, 1932
 E. Ross Adair Federal Building and United States Courthouse, Fort Wayne, 1932
 Goodrich Silvertown Tire and Service Station, Fort Wayne, 1930
 Harry L. Soshea House, 930 Prange, Fort Wayne, 1936
 Indiana State Highway Garage, Fort Wayne, 1938, 1968
 Lewis Bakeries (former Holsum Bakery Company), Fort Wayne, 1928 and 1948
 Lincoln Bank Tower, Fort Wayne, Indiana, 1930
 MacDougal Memorial Chapel, Fort Wayne
 North Manufacturing Building, 730 Growth, Fort Wayne, 1923
 REA Magnet Wire Company (former INCA Company Building), Fort Wayne, 1928
 Strebig Construction Building, Fort Wayne, 1958
 Trinity Hall, University of St. Francis, Fort Wayne, 1948
 Zollner Piston Company, Fort Wayne, 1931

Indianapolis 
 333 Penn (former Architects and Builders Building), Indianapolis, 1912 and 1929
 3762 North Meridian Street, Shortridge–Meridian Street Apartments Historic District, Indianapolis, 1948
 The Admiral, Indianapolis, 1929
 The Alameda, Indianapolis, 1925
 Bauer Apartments, Shortridge–Meridian Street Apartments Historic District, Indianapolis, 1937
 Bottleworks Hotel (former Coca-Cola Bottling Plant), Indianapolis, 1920, 1949
 Bush Stadium, Indianapolis, 1931
 Circle Tower, Indianapolis, 1930
 Clinical Building, Indiana University, Indianapolis, 1936
 The Garage Food Hall, Indianapolis, 1949
 H. P. Wasson and Company, Indianapolis, 1937
 Indiana Oxygen Company building, Indianapolis, 1930
 Indiana State Library and Historical Bureau, Indianapolis, 1934
 Indiana World War Memorial Plaza, Indianapolis, 1924
 Kassebaum Building, Indianapolis, 1928
 Madam Walker Legacy Center, Indianapolis, 1927
 Marion County Jail (former Cole Motor Car Company), Indianapolis, 1913
 The McKay, Indianapolis, 1924
 Old Trails Automobile Insurance Association, Indianapolis, 1928
 Sears and Roebuck, 333 Vermont, Indianapolis, 1929 or 1932
 Shortridge Apartments, Shortridge–Meridian Street Apartments Historic District, Indianapolis, 1938
 Willow Marketing Building, Shortridge–Meridian Street Apartments Historic District, Indianapolis, 1958

New Haven 
 621 Broadway Street, New Haven, 1925
 Navy Club (former Arrington Theatre, Broadway Theatre), New Haven, 1930 and 1945
 New Haven Adams Township Fire Department Station 1, New Haven

Shelbyville 
 Coca-Cola Bottling Company, Shelbyville, 1930
 First United Methodist Church, Shelbyville, 1920
 Grover Center Museum and Historical Society (former Elk's Lodge), Shelbyville, 1940
 Lora B. Pearson School, Shelbyville, 1939
 Porter Pool Bathhouse, Shelbyville, 1930
 Shelby County Courthouse, Shelbyville, 1937
 Shelby Tire & Auto Care, Shelbyville

South Bend 
 1000 Sample Street (former Wilson Brothers), South Bend, 1920
 1008 Lincolnway East, South Bend, 1925
 1011 Main Street, South Bend, 1924
 1237 Western Avenue, South Bend, 1914
 303 Chapin Street, South Bend, 1922
 407 Lincolnway West Apartments, South Bend, 1930
 Farmers Security Building, 133 South Main Street, South Bend, 1915
 Fire Station No. 4, South Bend, 1920
 Hoffman Hotel Apartments, South Bend, 1930
 I & M Building, South Bend, 1929
 Indiana Fencing Academy/Escrime du Lac Fencing Club, South Bend, 1950
 Jefferson Place, South Bend, 1920
 John Adams High School, South Bend, 1940
 Kaniewski Building, 1201 Western Avenue, South Bend, 1914
 Marquette School, South Bend, 1937
 NIPSCO Gas Building, South Bend, 1940
 PTL Tire Company, South Bend, 1930
 Robert A. Grant Federal Building and U.S. Courthouse, South Bend, 1933
 Rozplochowski Furniture, 1237 Western Avenue, South Bend, 1914
 South Bend Chocolate Company (former John Baungarth Company), South Bend, 1929
 South Bend Tribune Building, South Bend, 1922
 State Theatre, South Bend, 1934
 That Church Downtown (former Salvation Army), South Bend, 1946
 Twin City Building, South Bend, 1928
 Union Station, South Bend, 1929
 W. R. Hinkle and Company, South Bend, 1922

Terre Haute 
 1246 Maple Avenue, Twelve Points Historic District, Terre Haute, 
 AT&T Building (former Indiana Bell Building), Wabash Avenue–East Historic District, Terre Haute, 1940
 Citizens' Trust Company Building, Terre Haute, 1922
 Columbian Enameling and Stamping Company, Terre Haute, 1940
 Indiana Landmarks Western Regional Office (former Terre Haute Mutual Savings Association), Terre Haute, 1941
 McCalister Brothers Construction (former Merchants Freight company), Terre Haute, 1945
 National Building, Terre Haute, 1934
 RiverFront Lofts (former American Can Company, Pillsbury), Terre Haute, 1930
 Stalker Hall (now College of Arts and Sciences, Indiana State University), Terre Haute, 1954
 Swope Art Museum, Terre Haute, 1942
 Terre Haute Post Office and Federal Building, Terre Haute, 1933

Versailles 
 Gibson Theatre, Versailles, 1921 and 1929
 Tyson United Methodist Church, Versailles, 1937
 Versailles School and Tyson Auditorium, Versailles, 1938

Other cites 
 210 East Washington Street, Hartford City Courthouse Square Historic District, Hartford City, 1940
 American Steam Laundry Building, Washington Commercial Historic Distirct, Washington, 1930
 Anderson Bank Building, Anderson, 1928
 Armco-Ferro House, Century of Progress Architectural District, Beverly Shores, 1933
 Artcraft Theatre, Franklin, 1922
 Astra Theatre, Jasper, 1936
 Auburn Cord Duesenberg Automobile Museum, Auburn, 1930
 Buskirk-Chumley Theatre, Bloomington, 1934
 Central Fire Station, Columbus, 1941
 Coca-Cola Bottling Plant, Bloomington, 1924
 Colgate Factory, Jeffersonville, 1921
 Cooper Theater, Brazil Downtown Historic District, Brazil, 1947
 The Crump Theatre, Columbus, 1889 and 1941
 Decatur Township Junior High School, Decatur, 1938
 Devon Theater, Attica Downtown Historic District, Attica, 1938
 Eger Grocery Building, Rensselaer Courthouse Square Historic District, Rensselaer, 1930
 Forest Hill Cemetery Abbey, Greencastle, 1931
 Fountain County Courthouse, Covington, 1937
 Fowler Theatre, Fowler, 1940
 Haggar Hall, Saint Mary's College, Notre Dame, 1936
 Honeywell Center, Wabash, 1941–1952
 Howard County Courthouse, Kokomo Courthouse Square Historic District, Kokomo, 1937
 L. Fish Furniture Building, State Street Commercial Historic District, Hammond, 1927
 Peabody Memorial Tower, North Manchester, 1937
 Peru High School, Peru High School Historic District, Peru, 1939
 Pickwick Theatre, Syracuse, 1947
 Riley Hall, University of Notre Dame, Notre Dame, 1920
 Salvation Army, Bedford, 1930s
 Scheidler Theatre, Hartford City Courthouse Square Historic District, Hartford City, 1947
 Sowers & Gough Drugstore, Hartford City Courthouse Square Historic District, Hartford City, 1910 and 1940
 Temple Theatre, Mishawaka, 1916
 Times Theatre (former Char-Belle Theatre), Rochester, 1924
 Tower Hotel, Anderson, 1930
 Wigwam Mineola Tribe No. 86 Building, Franklin, 1920s

See also 
 List of Art Deco architecture
 List of Art Deco architecture in the United States

References 

 "Art Deco & Streamline Moderne Buildings." Roadside Architecture.com. Retrieved 2019-01-03.
 Cinema Treasures. Retrieved 2022-09-06
 "Court House Lover". Flickr. Retrieved 2022-09-06
 "New Deal Map". The Living New Deal. Retrieved 2020-12-25.
 "SAH Archipedia". Society of Architectural Historians. Retrieved 2021-11-21.
 "Welcome to SHAARD". Indiana State Historic Architectural and Archaeological Research Database Retrieved 2022-03-19.

External links
 

 
Art Deco
Art Deco architecture in Indiana
Indiana-related lists